Graddonidiscus is a genus of fungi within the Hyaloscyphaceae family. The genus contains 3 species.

References

External links
Graddonidiscus at Index Fungorum

Hyaloscyphaceae